Mount Helmcken is a large hill in Metchosin, east of Sooke, in British Columbia, Canada. 
It is also just west of Colwood. The mountain is accessed via Neild Road which runs all the way to the top where it joins Zanita Heights.

The mountain is named for John S. Helmcken, a surgeon for the Hudson's Bay Company who opposed the province's entry into Confederation, preferring annexation by the United States.

References

Mountains of British Columbia under 1000 metres